The 2022–23 season is Stevenage's ninth consecutive season in League Two and their 47th year in existence. In addition to the league, they will also compete in the 2022–23 FA Cup, the 2022–23 EFL Cup and the 2022–23 EFL Trophy.

Transfers

In

Out

Loans in

Loans out

Pre-season and friendlies
It was announced on 16 May 2022 that the club would travel to Jersey for a training camp and have a subsequent friendly on 2 July against Combined Counties League club Jersey Bulls. Then on 10 June, Stevenage confirmed a home pre-season friendly with Peterborough United along with three further away fixtures. A further home pre-season match was confirmed, against West Bromwich Albion. The seventh and final friendly to be announced was against Derby County.

Competitions

Overall record

League Two

League table

Results summary

Results by round

Matches

On 23 June, the league fixtures were announced.

FA Cup

Stevenage were drawn away to Gateshead in the first round, King's Lynn Town in the second round, Aston Villa in the third round and Stoke City in the fourth round.

EFL Cup

Stevenage were drawn away to Reading in the first round and at home to Peterborough United in the second round. For the first time in the club's history, Stevenage advanced to the third round of the EFL Cup, where they were defeated by Charlton Athletic on penalties.

EFL Trophy

References

Stevenage
Stevenage F.C. seasons
English football clubs 2022–23 season